Johnnie Moore (born 1983) is an American evangelical leader and businessman who founded the Kairos Company, a public relations firm. Moore is a commissioner for the United States Commission on International Religious Freedom and president of Congress of Christian Leaders.

Liberty University
Moore began his career in at Liberty University working in the Campus Pastors office. He was senior vice president for communications at Liberty University and often served as Jerry Falwell's assistant during his travels.  He was a professor of religion, and led the university's convocations.

Personal life 
Johnnie Moore is married to his wife Andrea and has three children.

International religious liberty

China 
Moore condemned China’s treatment of Muslims in 2017 and wrote an open letter to the Chinese premier alongside of Rabbi Abraham Cooper from the Simon Wiesenthal Center. In May 2021, the People's Republic of China issued retaliatory sanctions against Moore that banned him from entering the territory that it controls the United States issued sanctions against a Chinese official for the official's involvement in the detention of Falun Gong pratcitioners.

Middle East 
In 2017 Moore joined the Los Angeles Museum of Tolerance Press Conference calling for tolerance and the end of bigotry. Moore played a key role in the release of the historic Bahrain Declaration calling for rights for religious minorities in the Middle East. Days after the move of the Jerusalem embassy more led a multi-faith peace delegation from the Kingdom of Bahrain on a pilgrimage in Jerusalem. Moore’s Bahraini trip to Jerusalem prompted his being listed on the electronic intifada for allegedly forging and alliance between Bahrain and Israel in defiance of the Arab boycotts of Israel.

Moore met and raised awareness of human rights issues with the Saudi CP within weeks of the death of Khashoggi. He also visited the country on 9/11 and is an advocate of the Crown Prince’s Vision 2030 reform agenda. Moore participated in the announcement of the first ever Chief Rabbi for the United Arab Emirates and held meetings with heads of state throughout the Islamic world with the Crown Prince of the United Arab Emirates in 2018 as well as advocating for persecuted Hindus in India. He now serves on the ADL Task Force for Protecting Minority Groups in the Middle East.

Moore praised the Kingdom of Jordan for its interfaith efforts as well as praising the President of Azerbijain as a model of peaceful coexistence. He has also met with Israeli Prime Minister Benjamin Netanyahu and various Palestinian leaders, the President of Azerbaijan, and twice with the Crown Prince of the Kingdom of Saudi Arabia in 2019 and 2018 and he has met with the World Council of Churches.

Moore referred to the ISIS threat against Christians in Iraq and Syria as a “once in a 1000 year threat to Christianity.” He chartered a private jet and organized the evacuation and resettlement of ISIS victims from Northern Iraq to Slovakia over Christmas in 2015, a first in a series of efforts that eventually resettled over 10,000 Christian and Yazidi refugees displaced by ISIS. On September 11, 2019 he joined forces with Muhammad Alissa of the Muslim World League to issue a joint statement calling for cooperation between evangelicals like Moore and Muslims with a focus on protecting Christian holy sites. Moore is a critic of Iran and has called for the Iranian people to take back their religion from their supreme leader. He praised Pakistan’s prime minister for the arrest of a leading terrorist and in 2019 his advocacy was credited for the release of an 82-year-old Muslim prisoner of conscience in Pakistan, Abdul Shakoor.

Moore was among an evangelical delegation who met with Egyptian government officials and was the guest of Egypt’s president for the grand opening of the Middle East’s largest cathedral.

North Korea 
Moore was involved in bringing together liberal, moderate and conservative evangelicals in a joint call for prayer for peace in North Korea.

Political activity

Foreign policy

Moore called the Obama foreign policy a “failed experiment in American humility” and advocated for greater American hegemony in the Trump administration while warning, “It takes theater to win the White House these days but it takes temperament to run it”. He has called on European politicians to do more to combat terrorism. Moore wrote that one of the reasons why Evangelicals supported Trump’s move of the Jerusalem embassy was because they also care about Palestinians. He repeatedly downplayed the idea that Christian theology is why evangelicals support Israel and that the real reasons is more about geo-politics. Moore was among a contingent of evangelical leaders who met with Israeli Prime Minister Benjamin Netanyahu.

Social justice
Immigration: Moore was described by NPR as “pro Trump” and “pro DACA”. He collaborated with U.S. Representative Nancy Pelosi in advocacy for Dreamers. He was credited along with other evangelicals with moderating the President’s view on Dreamers.

Prison reform: Moore is a noted advocate for prison reform. Trump’s prison reform effort began with a conversation between Moore, Jared Kushner, Ivanka Trump and Samuel Rodriguez at a White House dinner on the eve of the National Day of Prayer.

Religious liberty: Moore offered to meet with Pope Francis after a Vatican newspaper attacked American evangelicals in order to build bridges between evangelicals and Catholics as it relates to immigration, religious persecution and other concerns. In a hugely critical editorial on conservative evangelicals, Jim Winkler, President of the National Council of Churches, credited Moore with having a different voice among conservative evangelicals. He criticized Joy Behar for remarks about Christians which compared their faith to “mental illness”, noting this was the faith of Billy Graham and Martin Luther King Jr. and Pope John Paul II. He advocated for the repeal of the Johnson Amendment, which bars the endorsement of political candidates by non-profits. Moore condemned racism, white supremacism and anti-semitism in the immediate aftermath of Unite the Right rally in Charlottesville, Virginia.

2016 presidential elections 
In 2016 CNN cited Moore as example of a "millennial evangelical", one of seven types of evangelicals that would make a difference in the election, quoting him as saying, "The difference between me and my parents' generation, the culture warriors, is that I actually know people on the other side, and I like them.'" Early in the campaign Moore was candidate Ben Carson's "special faith advisor".

Moore would go on to serve on then candidate Donald Trump's evangelical executive board alongside former Representative Michele Bachmann, founder of the Faith and Freedom Coalition Ralph Reed, and others to create a "consistent dialogue between Mr. Trump and the evangelical community". He stated he would have similarly served as an advisor to candidate Hillary Clinton had he been asked.

On June 21, 2016 Moore was among 900 evangelical leaders who met with then-candidate Trump. He also one of around 25 high-profile evangelical leaders in a smaller meeting with Trump that day . He told a reporter that what struck him was Trump's "sort of unwavering commitment to issues related to religious liberty", and that he was the "one candidate who says he will support the things that are important to us".

In 2019, after Trump was elected and in office, Moore tweeted a viral photo of evangelicals and spiritual advisers praying with Trump in the Oval Office with the caption "Such an honor to pray within the Oval Office for @POTUS & @VP."

Written works

 What Am I Supposed to Do with My Life?
 The Martyr’s Oath
 10 Things You Must Know about the Global War on Christianity
 Defying ISIS: Preserving Christianity in the Place of its Birth and in Your Own Backyard
 Dirty God

Honors and awards
Moore received the medal of valor from the Simon Wiesenthal Center.

Moore has spoken at the Georgetown University's Institute of Politics and Public Services and the USC's Annenberg School of Journalism He also spoke to JSOC at Fort Bragg.

References

Living people
American television producers
Liberty University faculty
American chief executives
1983 births